Kofi Amoa-Abban is a Ghanaian Oil and Gas entrepreneur, and philanthropist. He is best known as the founder and CEO of Rigworld Group, an oil services business with operations across West Africa.

Early life
Kofi Amoa-Abban was born in Tema, Ghana, the son of Kofi Amoa-Abban a Director at Textile company TTL, and Letitia Amoa-Abban a retail entrepreneur. Kofi Amoa-Abban attended Mfantsipim School in Cape Coast, Ghana. Kofi Amoa-Abban graduated from the University of Ghana with a degree in Psychology and subsequently pursued a masters degree at Oslo University.

Managing career
In 2011, Kofi Amoa-Abban started Rigworld from a small office in Osu, Accra providing recruitment services to the burgeoning oil and gas industry in Ghana. Prior to that, he had served as a drill crew member with Atwood Hunter responsible for the TEAK1, TEAK 2, and Banda Wells. In July 2015 Kofi Amoa-Abban co-founded PressureTech, a wholly owned subsidiary of Rigworld International Services, which offers engineering solutions to Oil and Gas companies in Ghana and beyond.

Companies
 Rigworld International Services Ltd.
 Rigworld Solutions
Steadfast Rigworld
Hydrasun Rigworld

 Score Rigworld
 Rigworld Training
 Transatlantic Services ltd.
 Axiss Shipping
 KOKA Energy
 Rigworld Petroleum

Awards
In February 2016, Kofi Amoa-Abban received an honorary doctorate in Business Administration "Honoris Causa" from two universities, the Commonwealth University and the London Graduate School who collaborated. In the same year Kofi Amoa-Abban received the "Extraordinary Entrepreneur" award from the Tema Excellence Awards Foundation.

Awards and nominations

References

1982 births
Living people
Mfantsipim School alumni
Oslo University College alumni
University of Ghana alumni
People from Central Region (Ghana)